Briar Hill is a suburb of Melbourne, Victoria, Australia, 18 km north-east from Melbourne's Central Business District, located within the City of Banyule local government area. Briar Hill recorded a population of 3,220 at the 2021 census.

History

Briar Hill Post Office opened on 1 September 1924.
Briar Hill primary school was opened

Education

There is a school in the area called Briar Hill Primary School, which was first established in 1927.

Facilities 
Public library service is provided by Yarra Plenty Regional Library.  The nearest libraries are at Greensborough, Watsonia and Eltham.

Notable people

Melbourne-based metal band Twelve Foot Ninja come from Briar Hill.

See also
 Shire of Diamond Valley – Parts of Briar Hill were previously within this former local government area.
 Shire of Eltham – Parts of Briar Hill were previously within this former local government area.

References

External links
Australian Places – Briar Hill

Suburbs of Melbourne
Suburbs of the City of Banyule